18-Methoxycoronaridine (18-MC, or MM-110) is a derivative of ibogaine invented in 1996 by the research team around the pharmacologist Stanley D. Glick from the Albany Medical College and the chemists 
Upul K. Bandarage and Martin E. Kuehne from the University of Vermont. In animal studies it has proved to be effective at reducing self-administration of morphine, cocaine, methamphetamine, nicotine and sucrose. It has also been shown to produce anorectic effects in obese rats, most likely due to the same actions on the reward system which underlie its anti-addictive effects against drug addiction.

18-MC was in the early stages of human testing by the California-based drug development company Savant HWP before being acquired by MindMed, a Canadian pharmaceutical company newly listed on the NASDAQ in April 2021.  In 2002 the research team began raising funds for human trials, but were unable to secure the estimated $5 million needed. In 2010, Obiter Research, a chemical manufacturer in Champaign, Illinois, signed a patent license with Albany Medical College and the University of Vermont, allowing them the right to synthesize and market 18-MC and other congeners. In 2012 the National Institute on Drug Abuse gave a $6.5 million grant to Savant HWP for human trials.  In 2017 it went into Phase-II trials in Brazil for treatment of Leishmaniasis at the Evandro Chagas Institute, but not for approval for use as a treatment for drug addiction. A phase 2a study of MM-110 treatment in patients experiencing opioid withdrawal is set to commence in Q2 2022.

Pharmacology 
18-MC is a α3β4 nicotinic antagonist and, in contrast to ibogaine, has no affinity at the α4β2 subtype nor at NMDA-channels nor at the serotonin transporter, and has significantly reduced affinity for sodium channels and for the σ receptor, but retains modest affinity for μ-opioid receptors where it acts as an agonist, and κ-opioid receptors. The sites of action in the brain include the medial habenula, interpeduncular nucleus, dorsolateral tegmentum and basolateral amygdala. (±)-18-MC competitively inhibits α9α10 nAChRs with potencies higher than that at α3β4 and α4β2 nAChRs and directly blocks CaV2.2.

Chemistry

Derivatives
A number of derivatives of 18-MC have been developed, with several of them being superior to 18-MC itself, the methoxyethyl congener ME-18-MC being more potent than 18-MC with similar efficacy, and the methylamino analogue 18-MAC being more effective than 18-MC with around the same potency. These compounds were also found to act as selective α3β4 nicotinic acetylcholine antagonists, with little or no effect on NMDA receptors.

See also 
 Coronaridine
 Ibogaine
 Noribogaine
 Voacangine

References 

Drug rehabilitation
Iboga
Nicotinic antagonists
NMDA receptor antagonists
Kappa-opioid receptor agonists
Mu-opioid receptor antagonists
Opioid modulators